Cool Dry Place is the debut studio album by American indie folk musician Katy Kirby. The album was released on February 19, 2021 through Keeled Scales.

Track listing

References

American folk music